Raulzito e os Panteras (Raulzito and the Panters) is the first album by the Brazilian rock musician Raul Seixas. It was recorded at the time he was known as Raulzito, with his supporting band Os Panteras. The album's artwork is based on that of The Beatles' With The Beatles (indeed, there is a Beatles cover version on the album: a Portuguese-language version of "Lucy in the Sky with Diamonds").

Track listing

Personnel 
 Raulzito - lead vocals, guitar, vocal arrangement
 Eládio - backing vocals, guitar, vocal arrangement
 Mariano - bass guitar, backing vocals, vocal arrangement
 Carleba - drums, vocal arrangement

References

External links
 [ Raulzito e os Panteras] at Allmusic

Raul Seixas albums
1968 debut albums
Portuguese-language albums
EMI Records albums